Limbu may refer to:
 Limbu people, an indigenous tribe living in Nepal, Sikkim and Bhutan
 Rambahadur Limbu (born 1939), Nepalese Gurkha recipient of the Victoria Cross
 Limbu language
 Limbu script
 Limbu (Unicode block)